Vina (Spanish: Viña, meaning "Vine") is a census-designated place (CDP) in Tehama County, California. The 2010 United States census reported Vina's population was 237.

Vina is the location of the Roman Catholic Trappist Abbey of New Clairvaux.

History
Hiram Good, “Indian hunter” homesteaded in Lower Deer Creek, later Vina,  
filing Proof of Claim in the Marysville office on February 4, 1857.

Lower Deer Creek became Vina in the 1860s when a winery was founded, and derives its name from the Spanish-language word meaning "vineyard". A post office has been in operation at Vina since 1871.

Geography
According to the United States Census Bureau, the CDP covers an area of 1.4 square miles (3.5 km), all of it land.

Demographics
The 2010 United States Census reported that Vina had a population of 237. The racial makeup of Vina was 195 (82.3%) White, 1 (0.4%) African American, 7 (3.0%) Native American, 2 (0.8%) Asian, 0 (0.0%) Pacific Islander, 20 (8.4%) from other races, and 12 (5.1%) from two or more races. Hispanic or Latino of any race were 42 persons (17.7%).

The Census reported that 203 people (85.7% of the population) lived in households, 34 (14.3%) lived in non-institutionalized group quarters, and 0 (0%) were institutionalized.

There were 70 households, out of which 29 (41.4%) had children under the age of 18 living in them, 39 (55.7%) were opposite-sex married couples living together, 11 (15.7%) had a female householder with no husband present, 5 (7.1%) had a male householder with no wife present.  There were 3 (4.3%) unmarried opposite-sex partnerships, and 0 (0%) same-sex married couples or partnerships. 10 households (14.3%) were made up of individuals, and 5 (7.1%) had someone living alone who was 65 years of age or older. The average household size was 2.90.  There were 55 families (78.6% of all households); the average family size was 3.20.

The population was spread out, with 49 people (20.7%) under the age of 18, 21 people (8.9%) aged 18 to 24, 61 people (25.7%) aged 25 to 44, 55 people (23.2%) aged 45 to 64, and 51 people (21.5%) who were 65 years of age or older.  The median age was 40.9 years. For every 100 females, there were 125.7 males.  For every 100 females age 18 and over, there were 129.3 males.

The homeowner vacancy rate was 3.8%; the rental vacancy rate was 9.5%.  152 people (64.1% of the population) lived in owner-occupied housing units and 51 people (21.5%) lived in rental housing units.

See also 
 Ishi, last known member of the Yahi people of the Yana people of the Native Americans in the United States

References

Census-designated places in Tehama County, California
Census-designated places in California